Andrea Limbacher (born 25 July 1989) is an Austrian freestyle skier, specializing in ski cross.

Limbacher competed at the 2010 Winter Olympics for Austria. She placed 23rd in the qualifying round in ski cross to advance to the knockout stages. She did not finish her first round heat, failing to advance.

As of April 2013, her only finish at the World Championships finishing 23rd, in 2011.

Limbacher made her World Cup debut in December 2009. As of April 2013, she has two World Cup victories, the first coming at Bischofswiesen in 2011/12. Her best World Cup overall finish in ski cross is 5th, in 2011/12.

World Cup Podiums

References

External links
  (alpine)
  (freestyle)
 
 

1989 births
Living people
Austrian female freestyle skiers
Olympic freestyle skiers of Austria
Freestyle skiers at the 2010 Winter Olympics
Freestyle skiers at the 2014 Winter Olympics
Freestyle skiers at the 2018 Winter Olympics
Freestyle skiers at the 2022 Winter Olympics
X Games athletes
People from Bad Ischl
Sportspeople from Upper Austria
21st-century Austrian women